Alliance Pipeline is a natural gas pipeline from Canada to the United States. It connects north-western Alberta and north-eastern British Columbia in western Canada to Illinois in the American Midwest, passing through Saskatchewan, North Dakota, Minnesota and Iowa. It is owned by Enbridge and Fort Chicago Energy Partners. Its FERC code is 176.

References

Natural gas pipelines in Canada
Natural gas pipelines in the United States
Canada–United States relations
Transport buildings and structures in British Columbia
Pipelines in Alberta
Pipelines in Saskatchewan
Natural gas pipelines in North Dakota
Natural gas pipelines in Minnesota
Natural gas pipelines in Iowa
Natural gas pipelines in Illinois